The second government of Ximo Puig was formed on 17 June 2019, following the latter's election as President of the Valencian Government by the Corts Valencianes on 13 June and his swearing-in on 15 June, as a result of the Socialist Party of the Valencian Country (PSPV–PSOE) emerging as the largest parliamentary force at the 2019 regional election.

The cabinet comprises members of the PSPV–PSOE, the Commitment Coalition (Compromís)—with the involvement of Valencian People's Initiative (IdPV) and Valencian Nationalist Bloc (Bloc, later transformed into More–Commitment)—and United We Can (Unides Podem)—comprising We Can (Podem) and United Left of the Valencian Country (EUPV)—, as well as a number of independents proposed by the first party.

Investiture

Cabinet changes
Puig's second government saw a number of cabinet changes during its tenure:
On 27 August 2021, second vice president and minister of Housing and Bioclimatic Architecture, Rubén Martínez Dalmau, announced his incoming resignation and farewell from politics following a number of disagreements with his party, Podem. The resignation was effective from 10 September, when Dalmau was replaced in both his posts by Héctor Illueca.
On 14 May 2022, the cabinet saw an extensive reshuffle. Arcadi España replaced Vicent Soler at the helm of the Finance and Economic Model department, in turn being replaced as Territorial Policy, Public Works and Mobility minister by Rebeca Torró. Vicent Marzà vacated the Education, Culture and Sports ministry, who was assumed by Raquel Tamarit, whereas the Universal Healthcare and Public Health post saw Ana Barceló being replaced by Miguel Mínguez. Carolina Pascual was replaced as Minister of Innovation, Universities, Science and Digital Society by Josefina Bueno.
On 21 June 2022, vice president Mónica Oltra resigned from all her government positions after the High Court of Justice of Valencia accused her and her ministry of negligence in the protection of a minor who was allegedly abused by her ex-husband, as well as an alleged concealment of the crimes. She was replaced in her government posts by Aitana Mas on 29 June.
On 25 October 2022, Mireia Mollà was removed as Minister of Agriculture, Rural Development, Climate Emergency and Ecological Transition by request of Aitana Mas, unveiling an internal crisis within their party, Valencian People's Initiative (IdPV). She was replaced in her post by Isaura Navarro the next day.

Council of Government
The Valencian Government is structured into the offices for the president, the two vice presidents, 11 ministries and the post of the secretary–spokesperson of the Government.

Departmental structure
Ximo Puig's second government was organised into several superior and governing units, whose number, powers and hierarchical structure varied depending on the ministerial department.

Notes

References

2019 establishments in the Valencian Community
Cabinets established in 2019
Cabinets of the Valencian Community